Sarah Flack is an American film editor. She frequently worked with American independent film directors Steven Soderbergh (Schizopolis, The Limey, Full Frontal)  and Sofia Coppola (Lost in Translation, Marie Antoinette, Somewhere, The Bling Ring, The Beguiled, On the Rocks). Flack's work on Lost in Translation won her the BAFTA Award for Best Editing. The film went on to win numerous other awards, including a Golden Globe Award for Best Motion Picture – Musical or Comedy and the Independent Spirit Award for Best Film.  She won a Primetime Emmy Award and an American Cinema Editors Eddie award with Robert Pulcini for co-editing the HBO film "Cinema Verite".

Flack began her career working as a production assistant on the film Kafka where she first met film director Steven Soderbergh. After assistant editing on a handful of other independent films, Flack was hired by Soderbergh to edit his self-financed experimental film, Schizopolis. She is represented by International Creative Management.

Filmography
Kafka (1991) (production assistant)
Swing Kids (1993) (apprentice editor)
Black Beauty (1994) (assistant editor)
White Man's Burden (1995) (assistant editor)
Romeo + Juliet (1996) (second assistant editor)
Schizopolis (1996) (uncredited editor)
The Limey (1999)  (editor)
Lush (1999) (editor)
Book of Shadows: Blair Witch 2 (2000) (editor)
Full Frontal (2002) (editor)
Swimfan (2002) (editor)
The Guys (2002) (editor)
Lost in Translation (2003)  (editor)
November (2004) (additional editor)
Looking for Kitty (2004)  (editor)
The Baxter (2005) (editor)
Dave Chappelle's Block Party (2005) (co-editor)
Marie Antoinette (2006) (editor)
Dan in Real Life (2007) (editor)
Away We Go (2009) (editor)
Somewhere (2010) (editor)
Cinema Verite (2011) (editor)
A Very Murray Christmas (2015) (editor)
The Beguiled (2017) (editor)
Lost Girls & Love Hotels (2020) (editor)
On the Rocks (2020) (editor)
Priscilla (film) TBA (editor)

Awards & nominations
Awards Won:
Lost in Translation (2003) - BAFTA Award - "Best Editing"
Cinema Verite (2011) - Primetime Emmy Awards - Outstanding Single-Camera Picture Editing for a Miniseries or a Movie 
Cinema Verite (2011) - American Cinema Editors Eddie Awards - "Best Edited Miniseries or Motion Picture for Television" 
Nominations:
Lost in Translation (2003) - American Cinema Editors Eddie Awards - "Best Edited Feature Film - Comedy or Musical"
The Limey (2000) - Online Film Critics Society Awards - "Best Editing"
On the Rocks (2020) - American Cinema Editors Eddie Awards - Best Edited Feature Film - Comedy

References

External links

https://www.vogue.com/article/oral-history-of-marie-antoinette-15th-anniversary
https://www.indiewire.com/influencers/sofia-coppola-sarah-flack/
https://variety.com/lists/women-of-awards-season-2021/
https://www.filmlinc.org/daily/listen-steven-soderbergh-cast-crew-discuss-the-limey-at-20th-anniversary-event/
https://twitter.com/filmlinc/status/1207850364894138368
https://www.indiewire.com/influencers/the-irishman-editor-thelma-schoonmaker/
https://www.focusfeatures.com/article/an_interview_with_somewhere_s_sarah_flack
 Photo of Sarah Flack, Producer Ross Katz and Sofia Coppola
"Full Frontal" By Stephanie Zacharek, about the prismatic editing "the editing... keeps your mind occupied in "Full Frontal", Aug. 2, 2002, Salon.com

 

American Cinema Editors
American film editors
Best Editing BAFTA Award winners
Living people
Year of birth missing (living people)